ATLAS3D is an astronomical survey that considers every galaxy in the deep sky within the local (42 Mpc) volume (1.16×105 Mpc3). This project utilizes multi-wavelength filters of a sample of 260 early-type galaxies. The survey use of numerical simulations and semi-analytic modeling to consider every galaxy and deep sky within the local (42 Mpc) volume (1.16×105 Mpc3). The first goal of this project is to quantify the global stellar kinematics and dynamics of a statistically significant sample of objects. This will permits catalog and characterize the class of early-type galaxies, as well as, to relate them to their formation and evolution.

The project use probe the mass-assembly epochs and timescales, in order to the ATLAS3D derive the star formation history. Another feature is that the project will help in characterize the different phases of the interstellar medium. This research process will link the kinematics of molecular, atomic and ionized gas with the dynamical structure, star formation and environment of the host galaxies. Other important contribution is the change of Hubble's classification of galaxies.

References

External links
 Atlas 3d Project Website
 Isaac Newton Group of Telescopes

Astronomical surveys
Observational astronomy